Syringa emodi is a species in the genus Syringa, in the family Oleaceae. It is also known as Himalayan lilac.

Description 
Height/Spread: Shrub to 5m in height, spreading to 4m.
Stems: Vigorous, upright branches with robust branchlets and stout shoots. Bark is silver-grey and lenticellate.
Leaves: Leaves are elliptic-oblong, measuring 9 cm to 15 cm in length and 5 cm in width, and are dark green and glabrous above and silvery-gray and slightly pubescent beneath when young.
Flowers: Unpleasantly scented, purple, pale lilac, or white flowers are borne on upright, terminal panicles to 15 cm long. Tube measures 1 cm in length; lobes short, valvate, linear-oblong, and hooded at the tips. Anthers protrude about halfway. Flowers in early summer, from May–June.
Fruit: Fruits September to October.

Habitat 
Slopes at 2000-3000m altitude.

Distribution 
Afghanistan, Pakistan, Western Himalaya, Kashmir (Ladakh), Nepal.

Cultivation 
Widely cultivated. Notable cultivars include:
'Aurea'
'Elegantissima'
'Variegata'

Etymology 

Emodi is derived from the Sanskrit hima, meaning 'snow' (Sanskrit hima-alaya, identifies the Himalayas as the 'abode of snow'). Syringa is derived from the Greek word syrinx, meaning 'pipe' or 'tube'. Named for the use of its hollow stems to make flutes. In Greek mythology, the nymph Syringa was changed into a reed.

References 

emodi
Flora of Afghanistan
Flora of the Indian subcontinent